Julia Simon (born 10 August 1991) is a German sport shooter.

She participated at the 2018 ISSF World Shooting Championships.

References

External links

Living people
1991 births
German female sport shooters
ISSF rifle shooters